Naraka is the realm of hell in Indian religions. According to some schools of Hinduism,  Jainism and Buddhism, Naraka is a place of torment. The word Neraka (modification of Naraka) in Indonesian and Malaysian has also been used to describe the Islamic concept of Hell.

Alternatively, the "hellish beings" that are said to reside in this underworld are often referred to as Narakas. These beings are also termed in Sanskrit as Narakiyas, Narakarnavas and Narakavasis.

Hinduism

Naraka is a realm in the Vedas, a place where souls are sent for the expiation of their sins. It is mentioned primarily in the Dharmashastras, Itihasas, and the Puranas, but also described in the Vedic samhitas, the Aranyakas and the Upanishads. Some Upanishads speak of 'darkness' instead of hell. A summary of the Upanishads and the Bhagavad Gita mentions hell several times. Adi Sankara also mentions it in his commentary on the Vedanta sutra. With the exception of the views of one Hindu philosopher, Madhva, it is not seen as a place of eternal damnation within Hinduism. 

In Puranas like Bhagavata Purana, Garuda Purana, and Vishnu Purana, there are elaborate descriptions of many hells. They are situated above the Garbhodaka Ocean. The Vishnu Purana mentions the names of the various Narakas:

Yama, the god of death and justice, judges living beings after their death and assigns appropriate punishments. For instance, the murderer of a Brahman, the stealer of gold, or a drinker of wine goes to the hell termed as Shukara, meaning swine. According to some Vedanta schools of thought, Nitya-samsarins (forever transmigrating ones) can experience Naraka for expiation. After the period of punishment is complete, they are reborn on earth in human or bestial bodies. Therefore, Naraka is not an abode of everlasting punishment. 

Yama Loka is the abode of Yama. Yama is also referred to as the Dharmaraja, or the king of dharma; Yama Loka may be compared to a temporary purgatorium for sinners (papi). According to Hindu scriptures, Yama's divine assistant, Chitragupta, maintains a record of the individual deeds of every living being in the world, and based on the complete audit of his deeds, dispatches the soul of the deceased either to Svarga (Heaven), or to the various Narakas, according to the nature of their sins. The scriptures describe that even people who have done a majority of good deeds could come to Yama Loka for redemption from the minor sins they have committed, and once the punishments have been served for those sins, they could be sent for rebirth to earth or to heaven. In the epic of Mahabharata, even the Pandavas (who represent righteousness and virtuousness) spend a brief time in hell for their minor sins.

At the time of death, sinful souls are vulnerable for capture by Yamaduttas, servants of Yama (who comes personally only in special cases). According to the Bhagavata Purana, Yama orders his servants to leave Vaishnavas alone. Sri Vaishnavas are taken by Vishnuduttas to Vaikuntha, and Gaudiya Vaishnavas to Goloka.

Buddhism

In Buddhism, Naraka refers to the worlds of greatest suffering. Buddhist texts describe a vast array of tortures and realms of torment in Naraka; an example is the Devadūta-sutta from the Pāli Canon. The descriptions vary from text to text and are not always consistent with each other. Though the term is often translated as "hell", unlike the Abrahamic hells, Naraka is not eternal, though when a timescale is given, it is suggested to be extraordinarily long. In this sense, it is similar to purgatory, but unlike both Abrahamic hell and purgatory, there is not inherently any God required to be involved in determining a being's entry and exit to and from the realm. Rather, the being is brought here—as is the case with all the other realms in the Buddhist cosmology—by natural law: the law of karma, and they remain until the negative karma that brought them there has been used up.

Jainism

In Jainism, Naraka is the name given to realm of existence in Jain cosmology having great suffering. The length of a being's stay in a Naraka is not eternal, though it is usually very long—measured in billions of years.  A soul is born into a Naraka as a direct result of his or her previous karma (actions of body, speech and mind), and resides there for a finite length of time until his karma has achieved its full result. After his karma is used up, he may be reborn in one of the higher worlds as the result of an earlier karma that had not yet ripened. Jain texts mention that these hells are situated in the seven grounds at the lower part of the universe. The seven grounds are:

 Ratna prabha
 Sharkara prabha
 Valuka prabha
 Panka prabha
 Dhuma prabha
 Tamaha prabha
 Mahatamaha prabha

See also
 Shurangama Sutra - Volume 6, Chapter 5: The Twelve Categories of Living Beings
List of numbers in Hindu scriptures

Notes

External links
 Definition at godrealized.com
 Wat Thawet Buddhist Learning Garden Feature Article

 
Afterlife places
Hell
Non-human races in Hindu mythology
Hindu cosmology
Sikh beliefs
Jain cosmology
Buddhist cosmology
Mythological places